Guido Marini (born 31 January 1965) is an Italian prelate of the Catholic Church who serves as the bishop of Tortona in northern Italy. A priest since 1989, from 2007 to 2021 he was Master of Pontifical Liturgical Ceremonies, serving under Pope Benedict XVI and Pope Francis. Before joining the papal household, Marini worked in the Archdiocese of Genoa, where he was the personal secretary to three archbishops from 1988 to 2003, chief liturgist from 2004 to 2007, and chancellor from 2005 to 2007.

Early years
He earned his B.A. in theology at the seminary in Genoa and was ordained a priest on 4 February 1989 by Cardinal Giovanni Canestri. He then earned a degree in both canon and civil law (JUD) from the Pontifical Lateran University with a dissertation on problems of church-state relations in the early 20th century.

He held the following positions in Genoa: secretary to the archbishop of Genoa from 1988 to 2003; master of liturgical celebrations from 2003 to 2007; member of the archdiocesan Council of Priests from 1996 to 2001; spiritual director of the seminary in Genoa from 2004 to 2007; and Chancellor of the Archdiocese from 2005 to 2007.

He earned a degree in the psychology of communication in 2007 from the Salesian Pontifical University.

Master of Pontifical Liturgical Celebrations

Marini was named Master of Pontifical Liturgical Ceremonies on 1 October 2007, appointed to another five-year term by Benedict XVI, confirmed in that office by Pope Francis in April 2014, and appointed to another five-year term in 2017. Francis also named him a member of the Congregation for the Oriental Churches on 19 February 2014.

Following his appointment as Master of Pontifical Liturgical Celebrations, the Papal Altar was rearranged with the seven candles and crucifix placed in a line across the altar rather than clustered on the sides, blocking to some extent the congregation's view of the celebrant. Discussing the changes he was implementing he said that compared to the liturgies celebrated under his predecessor, "now there is a different style, one that is more sober and more attentive to the essential things".

In a January 2010 speech, Marini supported calls in the Church for a "reform of the reform" of the liturgy. He said: "For some years now, several voices have been heard within Church circles talking about the necessity of a new liturgical renewal," adding that a new renewal movement would be "capable of operating a reform of the reform, or rather, move one more step ahead in understanding the authentic spirit of the liturgy and its celebration."

In 2015 Pope Francis made changes to the public ceremony of investiture of the pallium on metropolitan archbishops emphasizing that the investiture is an ecclesial event of the whole diocese, and not merely a juridical or ceremonial event. Marini said that from now on – starting from 29 June 2015 – the ceremony of investiture of the pallium will take place in each metropolitan archbishop's home diocese and not in the Vatican.

Marini also made decisions about the use of vestments at Mass and other pontifical celebrations, dressing cardinal deacons in dalmatics when serving at pontifical celebrations.

In 2019, Pope Francis made Marini's office responsible for the Sistine Chapel Choir, which until then operated independently within the papal household.

From the time of his priestly ordination, first in Genoa and then in Rome, he preached and provided spiritual direction, at times working with youth groups and communities of religious.

Papal conclave 2013 
Marini was Master of Ceremonies in the 2013 conclave that elected Pope Francis. On 11 March 2013, the day before the conclave, at a ceremony presided over by the Camerlengo Tarcisio Bertone, Marini led the non-cardinal officials, support staff and other non-elector personnel with duties in the conclave in taking an oath of secrecy pertaining to the conclave. The next day, after the cardinal-electors had taken their oath in the Sistine Chapel, Marini called out the command "Extra omnes" (Everyone out) and closed the chapel doors once all outsiders had left the chapel.

Bishop
 
On 29 August 2021, Pope Francis appointed him bishop of Tortona. Pope Francis consecrated him as a bishop in St. Peter's Basilica on 17 October, with Marini's installation in Tortona following on 7 November.

Works

Notes

References

External links

   

 

Living people
1965 births
21st-century Italian Roman Catholic priests
Liturgists
2013 papal conclave
Pope Benedict XVI
Pope Francis
Pontifical Lateran University alumni
20th-century Italian Roman Catholic priests
Italian Roman Catholic bishops
Bishops appointed by Pope Francis
21st-century Roman Catholic archbishops